The Ferrari 643 was a Formula One car designed by Steve Nichols and Jean-Claude Migeot and was built by Scuderia Ferrari for use in the 1991 Formula One season. Built during May and introduced at the French Grand Prix it initially looked to have the potential to run at the front.  Alain Prost qualified on the front row and took the lead, and although he was eventually passed by Nigel Mansell in his Renault powered Williams FW14, a second place in the car's first race looked promising. Aside from almost always being on the front part of the grid, it was not to be, however.
The chassis of the 643 was a total redesign over the 642 which suffered inconsistent handling issues and was designed to allow for softer suspension travel, as per Prost's request. The V12 engine was upgraded six major times during 1991, with the final evolution used from Portugal to the end of the season. The chassis itself had two revisions, the first after the French Grand Prix—which saw a relocation of the exhaust exits from underneath the car, and Belgium which saw minor alterations to the body cover.

The car was not as competitive a car like the Williams FW14 and McLaren MP4/6 cars; a big problem with the car lay with a lack of correct data gathering due to the team's turbulent management structure at the time. The car's results (or lack thereof) was one of the main reasons for the falling out between Prost and Ferrari, with the Frenchman eventually saying that "a truck would be easier to drive than this car". Following the Japanese Grand Prix, Prost was fired for the second time in his F1 career by a works team (he had also been fired by the Renault team just 2 days after the conclusion to the  season for his public criticism of the team's failure to adequately develop the Renault RE40 which had cost both himself and the team the respective Drivers' and Constructors' Championships). The team replaced him in Australia with test driver Gianni Morbidelli.

The car scored 39.5 points of the team's 55.5 points in 1991 (the 642 model was used to score 16 points in the first 6 races of the season) with 8 podiums and finished third in the Constructors' Championship.

The 643 was tested in early 1992 by Ivan Capelli for being replaced at the start of the  season by the Ferrari F92A.

Complete results
(key)

* 16 points scored using Ferrari 642

References

643